Brendan Horan (born 17 September 1974) is a South African cricketer. He played in eleven first-class and twelve List A matches from 1995/96 to 2000/01.

References

External links
 

1974 births
Living people
South African cricketers
Border cricketers
Gauteng cricketers
Cricketers from Cape Town